Calliostoma variegatum, common name the variable top shell, is a species of sea snail, a marine gastropod mollusk in the family Calliostomatidae.

Description
The height of the shell attains 25 mm. The small, conical shell is variegated. The nucleus is rosaceous. The six whorls are planate. The sutures are hardly impressed. The spire contains 3 regular, nodulous riblets, the nodules whitish, and subdistant. The interstices are very elegantly rosy. The base of the shell contains 8 lirulae. These are scarcely nodulous, and spotted with rosy.

Distribution
This species occurs in the Pacific Ocean from Alaska to California, USA.

References

External links
 To Biodiversity Heritage Library (18 publications)
 To ITIS
 To World Register of Marine Species
 

variegatum
Gastropods described in 1864